Montgat is a municipality in the comarca of the Maresme in 
Catalonia, Spain. It is situated on the coast between Badalona (Barcelonès) and El Masnou, to the north-east of 
Barcelona. The town is both a tourist centre and a (somewhat exclusive) dormitory town for Barcelona. The C-31 
autopista, B-20 autopista, the main N-II road and a RENFE railway line run through the town.

Etymology
There are several theories about the origin of his name, one of them being that the origin is Iberian, from "Mons-Cot", which means "Mount of Stone". In a document of the Monastery of San Pedro de las Puellas, the name "Monte Chato" appears.

Demography

References

 Panareda Clopés, Josep Maria; Rios Calvet, Jaume; Rabella Vives, Josep Maria (1989). Guia de Catalunya, Barcelona: Caixa de Catalunya.  (Spanish).  (Catalan).

External links 
Official website 
 Government data pages 

Municipalities in Maresme